Phillip Jamall Broussard (born August 19, 1981) is a former American football wide receiver. He played college football at Texas Tech, College of the Canyons, and San Jose State.

He is the older brother of NFL wide receiver John Broussard.

Early life and college
Broussard graduated from Kingwood High School at Houston, Texas in 1999 then attended Naval Academy Preparatory School for one year before enrolling at Texas Tech University. During his freshman year with the Texas Tech Red Raiders, Broussard rushed for 56 yards and an average 5.6 yards per carry. Coaches remarked that Broussard as a walk-on player rather than recruit had shown much surprise and promise.  In 2001, Broussard transferred to the College of the Canyons and signed with San Jose State University the following season.

Professional career
After the 2004 NFL Draft, Broussard signed as a free agent with the Cincinnati Bengals on April 27, 2004.  On October 14, 2004, the Carolina Panthers signed Broussard. Broussard played in eight games with the Carolina Panthers in 2004. In each of two games, Broussard lost a fumble. In 2005, the Panthers moved Broussard to the practice squad, and Broussard signed with the Miami Dolphins on June 29, 2006.

References

External links
SJSU profile (2003)

1981 births
Living people
African-American players of American football
African-American players of Canadian football
American football wide receivers
American football return specialists
American players of Canadian football
Canadian football wide receivers
Carolina Panthers players
Cincinnati Bengals players
College of the Canyons Cougars football players
Cologne Centurions (NFL Europe) players
Houston Texans players
Miami Dolphins players
People from Nederland, Texas
Players of American football from Houston
Players of Canadian football from Houston
San Jose SaberCats players
San Jose State Spartans football players
Texas Tech Red Raiders football players
Toronto Argonauts players
Philadelphia Soul players
People from Kingwood, Texas
21st-century African-American sportspeople
20th-century African-American people